Alain Berger (born 13 January 1970) is a Swiss orienteering competitor. He is two times Relay World Champion, as a member of the Swiss winning teams in 1991 and 1995. He also obtained bronze on the Classic distance in the 1999 World Championship.

References

External links
 
 

1970 births
Living people
Swiss orienteers
Male orienteers
Foot orienteers
Mountain bike orienteers
World Orienteering Championships medalists
20th-century Swiss people